Paul Squaglia (born 3 July 1964) is a French former professional footballer who played as a central defender.

External links
 
 Paul Squaglia profile at chamoisfc79.fr

1964 births
Living people
French footballers
Association football defenders
SC Bastia players
Olympique Lyonnais players
Chamois Niortais F.C. players
Nîmes Olympique players
Ligue 1 players
Ligue 2 players
Footballers from Corsica